Maheshwari Udyan, also known by its former name King's Circle (until 1962), is a park in Matunga, Mumbai. It was named after George V, the King-Emperor. The part of the road that leads to Chhatrapati Shivaji Terminus was formerly called Vincent Road. It was changed to Dr. Ambedkar Road almost 45 years ago. King's Circle station and Matunga railway station are next to each other, the former on the Harbour and the latter on the Central line.

Morarji Desai, then Union Finance minister of India, laid the foundation stone on 3 February 1962 to commemorate the name change.

Located very close to King's Circle station is South Indian Education Society High School, one of Mumbai's oldest schools. King's Circle is also central to places such as Koliwada, Wadala or Vadala, Sion, Dadar and C.G.S. Colony (Antop Hill); and is a location for real estate and business due to its central location and higher prices.

For several decades, Matunga and Sion were the roads terminal points. Beyond them was a marshy, unsuitable land mass, for habitation. All construction was taking place in South Mumbai. Land was reclaimed from the sea and made available for building sites.

Maheshwari Udyan is on the road. It passes through various flyovers reaching Thane Depot. From this Udyan, one can go by walk to western part of Matunga. The Railway workshop one small length bylane foot bridge, (Local folks call this lane 'Monkey bridge') which connects Matunga East to Matunga west.

References 

Neighbourhoods in Mumbai